The 2011 Italian motorcycle Grand Prix was the eighth round of the 2011 Grand Prix motorcycle racing season. It took place on the weekend of 1–3 July 2011 at the Mugello Circuit.

MotoGP classification

Moto2 classification

125 cc classification

Notes

Championship standings after the race (MotoGP)
Below are the standings for the top five riders and constructors after round eight has concluded.

Riders' Championship standings

Constructors' Championship standings

 Note: Only the top five positions are included for both sets of standings.

References

Italian motorcycle Grand Prix
Italian
Motorcycle Grand Prix
Italian motorcycle Grand Prix